The Highland Park Bridge is a truss bridge that carries vehicular traffic across the Allegheny River between the Pittsburgh neighborhood of Highland Park and the suburb of Aspinwall.

It replaced a much narrower 1902 streetcar bridge that was ill-equipped to handle heavy commuter traffic, as part of the process of suburbanization in the hills northeast of the city.

History
The bridge was designed by Sidney A. Shubin, chief bridge design engineer of Allegheny County, who also designed the South Tenth Street Bridge and Homestead High Level Bridge. Construction of the bridge began on November 6, 1937 and was completed in June 1939. The bridge cost $2.5 million to construct and was opened on June 22, 1939. Two workers were killed during the construction on October 14, 1938 when a 68-ton crane fell from the bridge.

See also 
List of crossings of the Allegheny River

References

External links
 
 Highland Park Bridge at Pghbridges.com

Bridges over the Allegheny River
Bridges completed in 1938
Road bridges in Pennsylvania